Dongdu Shilüe ("Summary of Events in the Eastern Capital") is an 1186 Chinese book chronicling the Northern Song dynasty (960–1126) history, written by Wang Cheng, a Southern Song official in the historiographic compilation bureau. It was so titled because Song's "Eastern Capital" Kaifeng had fallen to the Jin dynasty since the Jingkang incident in 1127.

Much of the information appears to be compiled by Wang Cheng's father Wang Shang (王賞), who worked in the editorial office for the Veritable Records during 1142–43.

Contents
The book contains 130 chapters (卷):
Chapters 1–12: annals of emperors (帝紀), one chapter each for every Northern Song emperor (from Emperor Taizu of Song to Emperor Qinzong)
Chapters 13–17: biographies of imperial relatives (世家)
Chapters 18–122: biographies (列傳), including the empresses
Chapters 123–130: supplementary monographs (附錄) about foreign countries: 2 chapters each for Liao dynasty, Jin dynasty, and Western Xia, and 1 chapter each for Tibet (Gusiluo regime) and Đại Việt (Ngô dynasty, Đinh dynasty, Early Lê dynasty, and Lý dynasty)

References

External links

Chinese history texts
12th-century history books
Song dynasty literature
1180s books
1186 in Asia
History books about the Song dynasty
12th-century Chinese books